Rímur (singular Ríma) may refer to:

 Rímur, Icelandic epic poetry
 Rímur (album), the album by Sigur Rós and Steindór Andersen
 Rima, the DC comic book hero
 Rille, an extraterrestrial geological feature
 Rimur Elias, a village in Fars Province, Iran
 Rimur Sharif, a village in Fars Province, Iran